The Space Fellowship is an international news and information network dedicated to the development of the space industry.

The organisation works to report and communicate space news and information to its valued community. Offering a unique and fresh approach, the International Space Fellowship works alongside leading space organisations with the goal of bringing space to the general public. Its online news service provides visitors with the latest news and updates from both inside and outside the space community.

History

In the early days the Space Fellowship was the Official X PRIZE Foundation web forum and a separate X PRIZE blog on Google's blogspot. On 12 July 2004 the X PRIZE Foundation web forum and the X PRIZE blog spot joined to form the X PRIZE News. On 18 October 2005 the X PRIZE News was renamed to the International Space Fellowship.

Members
Aerospace companies / Teams and prizes having their official forums listed on the Space Fellowship are:
 Armadillo Aerospace
 JP Aerospace
 Micro-Space
 Masten Space Systems
 Interorbital Systems
 Microlaunchers
 Cambridge University Spaceflight
 Epsilon vee
 Team Prometheus
 N-Prize

See also
Space advocacy

References

External links
 (archived in June 2019; spacefellowship.com now offline with message: "You can visit https://www.nasaspaceflight.com/ for recent Space News")

Private spaceflight
Commercial spaceflight
Space access
Space colonization
Space organizations
Space advocacy organizations
Space tourism
British news websites
Organizations established in 2003